Tales from the Thousand Lakes is the second full-length album by doom metal band Amorphis. It is a concept album, the lyrics are based on the Finnish national epic, Kalevala.

The album was an influential release in the development of the melodic death metal genre, predominantly mixing the genre with death-doom and gothic metal, compared to the band's death metal debut. This showcases a more melodic sound for the band, with hints at their later, more progressive direction. The album also introduced synthesizers and clean vocals to the band's sound, though the latter was used sparingly.

This is the first Amorphis release to have an official keyboardist, Kasper Mårtenson, as any previous of the band's releases had the band's own drummer, Jan Rechberger, provide the empty keyboardist role until the band decided to have a keyboardist and also to find one being Mårtenson. With Mårtenson in the band, it is the first time the band's original lineup changed by having an additional member. Jan Rechberger would leave the band after this album but rejoin the band for 2003's Far from the Sun.

The original limited version (on digipack) had a cover of "Light My Fire" by The Doors added as a bonus track. It was later re-released in 2001 with most tracks from the Black Winter Day EP and the "Light My Fire" cover added as bonus tracks.

Track listing

Bonus tracks 
Tracks 11–13 added from the Black Winter Day EP; track 14 is a bonus track:

Credits

Band members 
 Tomi Koivusaari – vocals, rhythm guitar
 Esa Holopainen – lead guitar
 Olli-Pekka Laine – bass
 Jan Rechberger – drums
 Kasper Mårtenson – keyboards

Additional musicians 
 Ville Tuomi – clean vocals, speech

References

External links 
 

Amorphis albums
1994 albums
Relapse Records albums
Music based on the Kalevala